An electoral symbol is a standardised symbol allocated to an independent candidate or political party by a country's election commission for use in election ballots.

Usage
Symbols are used by parties in their campaigning, and printed on ballot papers where a voter must make a mark to vote for the associated party. One of their purposes is to facilitate voting by illiterate people, who cannot read candidates' names on ballot papers. 

This may include: 

 easily identifiable real-world creatures, objects, or items such as the head of an elephant (Cambodian Democratic Party), a hand (Indian National Congress), an arrow (Pakistan People's Party) or a sailboat (Bangladesh Awami League). 
 numbers, such as the two-digit electoral numbers in Brazil, which can be easily recognized by illiterate voters.
 a letter or small group of letters.
 One, two, three or four Hebrew letters and additional symbols of one, two, three or four Arabic symbols is used in Israel (this also facilitates voters whose knowledge of Hebrew or Arabic, the two official languages, is limited).
 Danish and Icelandic parties are identified by a singular "party letter", which may or may not be the initial letter of the party's name.
 unique party logos or flags.

Symbols of the national parties of India 
In India, political parties are identified on ballot papers by their name and a pictorial symbol. The pictorial symbol helps the large percent of illiterate voters to identify the party they want to vote for. The party symbols are allocated by the Election Commission of India. A symbol assigned to a party designated as a national party can not be used by other parties in the country. A symbol assigned to a state party in one state can be allocated to different state party in another state.

See also
Elections in Israel#Voting method

External links 
 The curious stories of Indian party symbols (The Diplomat)
 Ceiling fans, brooms and mangoes: The election symbols of India's political parties (CNN)
 From ceiling fan to comb, Indian political parties woo voters with the strangest party symbols (Business Insider India)
 Election symbols in India (YouTube)
 Lotus, hand, elephant, broom: The symbols that drive Indian politics (TRTWorld)
 The Problem With Using Symbols on Ballots in Pakistan (The Atlantic)
 The power of political symbols (The Asian Age)

References

Elections